The Serbo-Croatian standard languages (Serbian, Croatian, Bosnian and Montenegrin) have one of the more elaborate kinship (srodstvo) systems among European languages. Terminology may differ from place to place. Most words are common to other Slavic languages, though some derive from Turkish. The standardized languages may recognize slightly different pronunciations or dialectical forms; all terms are considered standard in all language standards, unless otherwise marked: [S] (Serbian), [C] (Croatian), [B] (Bosnian) and [M] (Montenegrin) below.

There are four main types of kinship in the family: biological  blood kinship, kinship by law (in-laws), spiritual kinship (such as godparents), and legal kinship through adoption and remarriage.

As is common in many rural family structures, three generations of a family will live together in a home in what anthropologists call a joint family structure, where parents, their son(s), and grandchildren would cohabit in a family home.

Direct descendance and ancestry
Words for relations up to five generations removed—great-great-grandparents and great-great-grandchildren—are in common use. The fourth-generation terms are also used as generics for ancestors and descendants. There is no distinction between the maternal and paternal line.

Own generation
Diminutive forms of siblings are used for cousins.

Indirect ancestry, descendants and legal relations
There are separate terms for maternal and paternal uncles, but not for aunts. In addition, spouses of uncles and aunts have their own terms.

In-laws
There are separate terms for a man's and a woman's parents-in-law. However, the same terms are commonly used for siblings-in-law and children-in-law. There are separate terms for co-siblings-in-law.

Step-relatives
There are spouses of ancestors that are not blood relatives and their spouse's descendants, second spouse of father's or mother's siblings (paternal or maternal step-aunts and step-uncles) and their children.

Foster-relatives
Foster relations are important and have dedicated terms.

References

Further reading
 

Serbo-Croatian language
Kinship
Kinship
Kinship
Kinship
Kinship terminology
Montenegrin culture
Montenegrin language
Bosniak culture
Bosnian language
Bosnia and Herzegovina culture
Serbian genealogy